The 1907 Rhode Island gubernatorial election was held on November 5, 1907. Incumbent Democrat James H. Higgins defeated Republican nominee Frederick H. Jackson with 50.37% of the vote.

General election

Candidates
Major party candidates
James H. Higgins, Republican
Frederick H. Jackson, Democratic

Other candidates
Louis E. Remington, Prohibition
William H. Johnston, Socialist
John W. Leach, Socialist Labor

Results

References

1907
Rhode Island
1907 Rhode Island elections